Mycolicibacter algericus (formerly Mycobacterium algericum) is a species of bacteria from the phylum Actinomycetota that was first isolated from the lung lesion of a goat. It is non-pigmented and grows slowly at 25–42 °C on Löwenstein–Jensen medium. It has also been isolated from freshwater fish, fresh produce, water treatment plant sludge, and a natural cave.

References

Acid-fast bacilli
algericus
Bacteria described in 2011